Robert Byron Jones (1833 – July 20, 1867) was a justice of the Louisiana Supreme Court from April 1, 1865, to July 1, 1866.

Born in Florida in 1833, Jones served in the Louisiana State Legislature from 1864 to 1865, and was chairman of the Judiciary Committee. In 1867, Jones was arrested in Natchitoches, Louisiana on a charge of having been implicated in the murder of one Cyrus W. Stauffer. While confined in the military prison in the city, he fell ill with cholera, and was released. He died a few hours later, in New Orleans. Jones had a brother who was a doctor who also died of cholera only a few days earlier.

References

1833 births
1867 deaths
People from Florida
Members of the Louisiana State Legislature
Justices of the Louisiana Supreme Court
Deaths from cholera
19th-century American politicians
19th-century American judges